Barbara Eck (born 6 May 1968) is an Austrian judoka. She competed in the women's lightweight event at the 1992 Summer Olympics.

References

External links
 

1968 births
Living people
Austrian female judoka
Olympic judoka of Austria
Judoka at the 1992 Summer Olympics
Sportspeople from Styria
People from Leibnitz District
20th-century Austrian women